The ballistic limit or limit velocity is the velocity required for a particular projectile to reliably (at least 50% of the time) penetrate a particular piece of material.  In other words, a given projectile will generally not pierce a given target when the projectile velocity is lower than the ballistic limit.  The term ballistic limit is used specifically in the context of armor; limit velocity is used in other contexts.

The ballistic limit equation for laminates, as derived by Reid and Wen is as follows:

where
 is the ballistic limit
 is a projectile constant determined experimentally
 is the density of the laminate
 is the static linear elastic compression limit
 is the diameter of the projectile
 is the thickness of the laminate
 is the mass of the projectile

Additionally, the ballistic limit for small-caliber into homogeneous armor by TM5-855-1 is:

where
 is the ballistic limit velocity in fps
 is the caliber of the projectile, in inches
 is the thickness of the homogeneous armor (valid from BHN 360 - 440) in inches
 is the angle of obliquity
 is the weight of the projectile, in lbs

References 

Ballistics